Syzygium variolosum is a species of plant in the family Myrtaceae. It is endemic to Peninsular Malaysia.

References

variolosum
Endemic flora of Peninsular Malaysia
Least concern plants
Taxonomy articles created by Polbot
Taxobox binomials not recognized by IUCN